Charlie Bubbles is a 1968 British comedy-drama film directed by Albert Finney in his feature directorial debut. The film stars Finney alongside Billie Whitelaw and Liza Minnelli. It was screened at the 1968 Cannes Film Festival on the 11th, just before the festival was called off due to the events of May 1968 in France.

The film made great play of its Manchester setting, contrasting the return of its eponymous lead character, played by Finney, to his home city after achieving success as a writer in London. During his return, he visits his former wife, played by Whitelaw, in Derbyshire, and watches a Manchester United match at Old Trafford (featuring footage of Bobby Charlton and Denis Law) with his son. They are cut off from the outside world in a glass-fronted box as they watch the match. Finney's character is bored with his success and his privileged position, which allows him to indulge himself in most ways he wishes. One of these is a relationship with his secretary Eliza, played by Minnelli.

Plot
Bubbles glides around in a gold Rolls-Royce Silver Cloud III convertible – CB 1E, contrasting sharply with the working class life and the poverty of post-war Salford. From London along the newly constructed M1, Bubbles heads to Manchester, a journey that is depicted as taking almost an age to complete. The scenes at the petrol station before they set off, and at the motorway service station with Yootha Joyce portrayed as an ostentatious millionairess and Alan Lake the RAF squaddie who cadges a lift and eventually drives the Rolls, tell a story of two tales. When they arrive in Manchester the reference to the colliery and the gas works further put forward the message that Bubbles has come a long way since he was a boy, but that even now after his success he isn't really fulfilled. Liza Minnelli photographs a hatchet-faced old man at a bus stop and the child on a bike whilst driving open-top along the cobbled crumbling streets of cleared Victorian working-class terraced houses.

The street scenes are a reminder of a Manchester that is long gone and are an accurate record of the mass demolition of so much of working class Victorian back-to-back dwellings. Joe Gladwin plays a waiter serving breakfast in the Manchester hotel room. "I used to know your father Sir, is he still deaf? ... He was unemployed for some years... We're all very proud of you. Are you still working Sir or do you just do the writing now?" Bubbles smiles wryly and retorts: "No, I just do the writing" and hands him a bank note. The screenplay was written by Shelagh Delaney.

After leaving Manchester, Bubbles drives to see his son Jack (Timothy Garland), and it becomes obvious that visits are few and far between. We are also introduced to his ex-wife Lotti (Billie Whitelaw), who is running a farm (bought by Bubbles) deep in the Derbyshire hills. Father and son go to a football match and eat hotdogs from their private box at Old Trafford, where an old school friend turned newspaper reporter enters the box and the two chat awkwardly for a few moments, the friend declaring that he would never leave his grass roots, talking of London and the people who "get bogged down with a lot of false values" – a sentence that is clearly aimed towards the boy who done good. The film then sharply cuts to scenes outside the stadium where Charlie is suddenly looking for the boy. Bubbles returns to the farm without the boy, driving the Rolls erratically and stopping to vomit on the way, only to find Jack has found his own way home and is now watching television. There is some retrospective and reminiscent interplay between Finney and Whitlelaw, and it isn't difficult to see why she won a BAFTA in 1968 for Best Supporting Actress.

Much of the film depicts the world from the mind of the person, whereby the viewer becomes Charlie so we see much of the film through the eyes of a clever but melancholy and dissatisfied observer of life. The character Charlie Bubbles was almost type-casting for Finney; he had risen to film-stardom from a background as a bookie's son in the neighbouring, mainly working class Pendleton district of Salford. Charlie Bubbles was not only Albert Finney's debut as a director, but was also the last time he directed a box-office film.

The film is a slightly surreal offshoot of the kitchen sink drama, in which Finney had achieved stardom through starring in Karel Reisz's Saturday Night and Sunday Morning of 1960. Shelagh Delaney had also achieved fame as the writer of another film in this genre, Tony Richardson's 1961 A Taste of Honey. Further to this, Delaney wrote Lindsay Anderson's 1967 film The White Bus – like Charlie Bubbles, set in part in Manchester and Salford – which has a distinctly surreal feel to it at times. Charlie Bubbles is referred to in the Kinks' song "Where Are They Now?", on the album Preservation Act 1.

Cast
 Albert Finney as Charlie Bubbles
 Colin Blakely as Smokey Pickles
 Billie Whitelaw as Lottie Bubbles
 Liza Minnelli as Eliza
 Timothy Garland as Jack Bubbles
 Richard Pearson as Accountant
 Nicholas Phipps as Agent
 Peter Sallis as Solicitor
 Charles Lamb as Mr. Noseworthy
 Margery Mason as Mrs. Noseworthy
 Diana Coupland as Maud
 George Innes as Garage Attendant
 Arthur Pentelow as Man with Car
 Alan Lake as Airman
 Yootha Joyce as Woman in Cafe
 Wendy Padbury as Woman in Cafe
 Susan Engel as Nanny

Release

Critical response
Although the film received critical acclaim, it was not a commercial success in Britain. Finney blamed this on what he regarded as a mishandled and much-delayed release by Rank Film Distributors.

In a contemporary New York Times review, critic Renata Adler praised the film, which she called "a becalmed Blow-Up" and "a completely honest and original thing." She also added: "The ending, a low key absurdist touch, is as quiet, beautifully made and carefully thought out as the rest."

Home media
The film was released on DVD in September 2008, and on Blu-ray in November 2018.

References

Bibliography
 Murphy, Robert. Directors in British and Irish Cinema: A Reference Companion. British Film Institute, 2006.

External links

1968 films
1968 comedy-drama films
British comedy-drama films
Films directed by Albert Finney
Films shot at Pinewood Studios
Films set in Manchester
Films set in London
Films shot in London
Films shot in Greater Manchester
1968 directorial debut films
1960s English-language films
1960s British films